The legal system of Chile belongs to the Continental Law tradition.
The basis for its public law is the 1980 Constitution, reformed in 1989 and 2005. According to it Chile is a democratic republic. There is a clear separation of functions, between the President of the Republic, the Congress, the judiciary and a Constitutional Court. See Politics of Chile.
On the other hand, private relationships are governed, mainly, by the Chilean Civil Code, most of which has not been amended in 150 years. There are also several laws outside the Code that deal with most of the business law.

Public law

Constitution

The current Political Constitution of the Republic of Chile, approved by Chilean voters in a tightly controlled  plebiscite on September 11, 1980, under Augusto Pinochet, and made effective on March 11, 1981, has been amended in 1989, 1991, 1994, 1997, 1999, 2000, 2001, 2003 and 2005.

In 2005 over 50 reforms were approved, which eliminated some of the remaining undemocratic areas of the text, such as the existence of non-elected Senators (appointed senators, or senators for life) and the inability of the President to remove the Commander in Chief of the Armed Forces. These reforms led the President to controversially declare Chile's transition to democracy as complete.

There is a constitutional court (Tribunal Constitucional) with the competence to declare a singular law "not applicable" to an individual case (inaplicabilidad por inconstitucionalidad) and, having declared that at least once, the unconstitutionality of that law in general.

Administrative law 
The President of the Republic must fulfill the administrative function, in collaboration with several ministries or other authorities with ministerial rank. Each Ministry has one or more sub secretaries. The actual satisfaction of public needs is performed  through public services, dependant or at least related to one of those sub secretaries.

All Ministries and public services have a body of workers or administrative personnel (funcionarios públicos).

Public property is subject to privileges and burdens, because it serves public purposes. The sea, rivers and lakes, mines and natural reservations belong to the state and may be used by "anyone", but when individual exploitation is possible then it is in the hands of privates. On the other hand, buildings, cars and other supplies that are necessary for the work of public agencies are also property of the state.

Public entities act through administrative procedures, that is, processes with formal stages where opportunities to deliver evidence and exercise appeals are granted to  the citizens. The recent basic law of administrative procedures deals with most of the general matters pertaining the administrative procedures of all public entities.

There is not a singular administrative court to deal with actions against the administrative entities, but several specialized courts and procedures of review. However, civil courts have jurisdiction over all matters that are not in the scope of other tribunal, such as public liability and the overturn of single administrative acts.

Regulation 
Since the privatization of most economic activities in the 1980s, the President and the independent agencies became the main policy makers regarding the regulation of the economy, subordinated to legislation.

The exploitation of mines and water resources is given in concession to  private entrepreneurs.

All activities that can have a significant impact on the environment must obtain an administrative authorization and are subject to heavy regulation by several different agencies.

There are agencies (Superintendencias) dealing with:
 Electricity and Fuels (Superintendencia de Electricidad y Combustibles, SEC),
 Water Supply and Treatment (Superintendencia de Servicios Sanitarios, SISS),
 Banking and Finance, Stock Exchange and Insurances (Comisión para el Mercado Financiero, CMF)
CMF was created by merging of former agencies: Superintendencia de Bancos e Instituciones Financieras, SBIF and Superintendencia de Valores y Seguros, SVS.
 Casinos (Superintendencia de Casinos de Juegos, SCJ)
 Bankruptcy (Superintendencia de Insolvencia y Reemprendimiento, SIR),
 Environmental Protection (Superintendencia de Medio Ambiente, SMA),
 Pensions and Retirement Funds (Superintendencia de Pensiones, SP),
 Social Security (Superintendencia de Seguridad Social, SUSESO),
 Health (Superintendencia de Salud),
 Education (Superintendenica de Educación), etc.

Private law

Civil Code 

The Civil Code of the Republic of Chile is the work of the Chilean-Venezuelan jurist and legislator Andrés Bello. After several years of individual work (though officially presented as the work of multiple Congress commissions), Congress passed the Civil Code into law on 14 December 1855, and came into force on 1 January 1857. The Code has kept in force since then though it has been the object of numerous alterations.

The main modernisations the code has undergone have affected family law and the law of successions. On one hand, these reforms have introduced more equal relations between men and women and, on the other, they have eliminated discriminations between children born from married couples and those born extramaritally.

Being part of the civil law tradition, there is no obedience to precedent in Chilean law. Nevertheless, sentences of a higher court can be appealed to the Supreme Court based in the erroneous application of the law, thus being able to deliver uniform decisions in controversial matters of law. See Judiciary of Chile.

Commerce 
Though the Commerce Code of 1868 was the main source of business law, nowadays the legislation is widely spread in many legislative bodies.

For instance, both the Civil Code and the Commerce Code deal with the basic matters of enterprises, but corporations and limited liability enterprises have a statute of its own.

Recently the law of bankruptcy has been incorporated in the Commerce Code, in a process of re-codification.

Matters such as banking and the stock exchange are strongly regulated by government agencies and therefore are subject to public scrutiny. Recently, these agencies have fined important executives for insider trading.

Family 
Originally, Family law in Chile was created according to the conservative spirit of the society of 19th century. Their principles was: high protection of matrimonial family (and discrimination ni non-matrimonial filiation), authority of husband over wife, and a great parental power over the children. Also, in the beginnings the Catholic Church has the control in many familiar actions, but with the Laicist Acts (Leyes Laicas) were transferred their powers to state agencies, like the Civil Registration, and created the Civil Marriage in 1884.

However, there were several reforms across the 20th century, for the purpose of ending legal discrimination and make family relationships more equal, in addition to protecting the most vulnerable members. Therefore, in 1967 is created the Childs Act (Ley de Menores), in 1993 the Domestic Violence Act (Ley de Violencia Intrafamiliar) and in 2004 a new Civil Marriage Law (Ley de Matrimonio Civil) that introduces divorce. Likewise, Civil Code was reformated many times for doing better conditions for married women, and in 1989 the husband authority was repealed; on the other hand, in 1998 it introduces a new filiative system that gives equal rights to children born inside or outside a marriage.

In recent years, new reforms allows to same-sex couples obtain many rights. Thus, in 2014 is created the Civil Union Agreement (Acuerdo de Unión Civil), and in 2021 is established the same-sex marriage.

Since 2005, a separate familiar procedure is established by the Family Courts (Juzgados de Familia) with a verbal trial.

Criminal law
Since the year 2000, Chilean criminal procedure is experiencing one of the most important legal reforms of the country's history, completely replacing an inquisitory procedure by an accusatory system, very similar to that of Germany or the United States. While the prosecution is in charge of an autonomous authority (Ministerio Público), the actual judgement is made by a collegiate court (Tribunal de Juicio Oral en lo Penal). Trials are public and verbal. However, the law grants several alternatives to the defendant so as to avoid the trial, but, at the same time, grant the victim's satisfaction and the public safety.

The Chilean Criminal Code, which defines the conducts that constitute an offense and the applicable conviction, dates back to 1874. It was greatly inspired by the Spanish Code of 1848 and the Belgian Code of 1867. The Code has been widely criticized, and the Ministry of Justice is studying a complete replacement by the year 2010.

See also
History of Chile
Economy of Chile

Notes

References

Brief review of Chile's constitutional history – Chile's Library of Congress (in Spanish)
Vergara Blanco, Alejandro, "Panorama General del Derecho Administrativo Chileno", in Santiago González-Varas (dir.) ''El Derecho Administrativo Iberoamericano", pp. 137 ss.
Tapia Rodríguez, Mauricio, "Código Civil 1855–2005. Evolución y Perspectivas", Ed. Jurídica de Chile, 2005, p. 45.
Somarriva Undurraga, Manuel, "Evolución del Código Civil chileno", Ed. Nascimento, 1955.
Edwin Montefiore Borchard. Guide to the law and legal literature of Argentina, Brazil and Chile. Law Library of Congress. Government Printing Office. Washington. 1917. Internet Archive
Helen Lord Clagett. A guide to the law and legal literature of Chile, 1917–1946. Library of Congress. Washington. 1947. HathiTrust
Daniela Horvitz. Family law in Chile: overview. Thomson-Reuters Practical Law. 2020.

Law of Chile
Law in South America